Kendriya Vidyalaya, Mati (Hindi for Central School) is a system of central government schools under the Ministry of Human Resource Development India. It is located near the district headquarters of Kanpur Dehat district on National Highway No.2

History
The school initially started on 15 August 1947 with grades from 1st to 8th, but later on it grew with the addition of grade 10, now the school has grades up to 12. Initially classes started in the Akbarpur Inter College campus on Akbarpur-Rura road town Akbarpur, Kanpur Dehat from 1 April 2007 and school transferred to own new building from July 2012.

Faculties
Science
Commerce

Facilities
Play ground and sports
Library and reading room
Laboratories (Physics, Chemistry and Biology)
4 Computer Labs
Labs with Interactive Boards
Activity Rooms
Labs with A.C

List of Principals
 Y Bharadwaj (01/04/2007---31/05/2007)
 Mrs. P Goswami (01/06/2007---30/05/08)
 B L Raman (30/05/2008---31/03/2012)
 Rajendra Prasad Tripathi  (06/08/2012---31/07/2016)
A K Rai (01/07/2016---till date)
 Chandra Bhushan Mishra

References

Kendriya Vidyalayas in Uttar Pradesh
Primary schools in Uttar Pradesh
High schools and secondary schools in Uttar Pradesh
Education in Kanpur Dehat district
Educational institutions established in 2007
2007 establishments in Uttar Pradesh